A university constituency is a constituency, used in elections to a legislature, that represents the members of one or more universities rather than residents of a geographical area. These may or may not involve plural voting, in which voters are eligible to vote in or as part of this entity and their home area's geographical constituency.

When James VI inherited the English throne in 1603, the system was adopted by the Parliament of England. The system was continued in the Parliament of Great Britain (from 1707 to 1800) and the United Kingdom Parliament, until 1950. It was also used in the Parliament of Ireland, in the Kingdom of Ireland, from 1613 to 1800, and in the Irish Free State from 1922 to 1936.

Such constituencies have also existed in Japan and in some countries of the British Empire such as India.

At present there are four instances in two countries of university constituencies: two in the Seanad Éireann (the upper—and in general less powerful—house of the legislature of the Republic of Ireland) and two in the Senate of Rwanda.

Summary

As shown, at Westminster (in the English then successor British parliaments) 4 seats were incepted in 1603 and the final total, 12, were abolished in 1950.

The Northern Irish body was the last in the UK to abolish such seats: it abolished its four for Queens, Belfast in 1969.

Six such seats continue in Seanad Éireann, the upper chamber of the Oireachtas (legislature of the Republic of Ireland). They are the sole directly elected members of the Seanad, with the remainder of the seats being elected by a combination of members of Oireachtas, incoming TDs and outgoing Senators, and local councillors, along with 11 members appointed by the Taoiseach.

Historical representation by party (UK)
A cell marked → has a different colour background to the preceding cell and denotes an incumbent who defected or won a re-election for another party.

1885 to 1918

1918 to 1950

Historical representation by party (Ireland)
A cell marked → has a different colour background to the preceding cell and denotes an incumbent who defected or won a re-election for another party.

Dáil Éireann

Seanad Éireann

United Kingdom

King James VI of Scotland, on ascending the English throne, brought to the English Parliament a practice which endured in the Scottish Parliament of allowing the universities to elect members. The king believed that the universities were often affected by the decisions of Parliament, and ought therefore to have representation in it. James gave the University of Cambridge and the University of Oxford two seats each from 1603. On the formal Union (1707), Scottish universities lost their representatives as none were appointed to the Parliament of Great Britain (at Westminster). The voters were the graduates of the university, whether they were resident or not; they could vote for the university seats in addition to any other vote that they might have.

After the Act of Union 1800 with Ireland, the University of Dublin (Trinity College), which had elected two MPs to the Parliament of Ireland since 1613, was allowed one member from 1801 and two from 1832.

In 1868, three new one-member seats were created: University of London; Glasgow and Aberdeen universities combined; and St Andrews and Edinburgh universities combined.

In 1918, the Queen's University of Belfast and the National University of Ireland each received seats. Both these, as well as the University of Dublin, also received four seats in the devolved Stormont parliament and the Southern Ireland parliament respectively that were established in 1920 and first used in elections in 1921. Also in 1918, the Scottish universities switched to all electing three members jointly (see Combined Scottish Universities).

In 1918, all the other English universities (i.e. except for Cambridge, Oxford and London) were enfranchised as a single constituency with two seats, as Combined English Universities. They were Birmingham, Bristol, Durham, Leeds, Liverpool, Manchester, and Sheffield. Reading was added in August 1928. The University of Wales also received one seat in 1918.

1918 also saw the introduction of the Single Transferable Vote for university constituencies.

Abolition
The Labour government in 1930 attempted to abolish the university constituencies but was defeated in the House of Commons. Although the members for the university constituencies were usually Conservatives, in the later years independent candidates began to win many of the seats. The Labour government finally abolished the university constituencies via the Representation of the People Act 1948, with effect from the dissolution of Parliament in 1950, along with all other examples of plural voting.

The Queen's University, Belfast constituency survived in the Parliament of Northern Ireland until it was abolished in 1968 (with effect from the dissolution of Parliament in 1969) by the Electoral Law Act (Northern Ireland) 1968 (1968 c. 20, Act of the Stormont Parliament). This was one of several measures by the then Northern Ireland Prime Minister Terence O'Neill to reform elements of the election franchise and deal with many long-standing civil rights grievances.

Notable members for these constituencies
The members for the university constituencies include many notable statesmen: William Pitt the Younger and Lord Palmerston both served as MPs for Cambridge University, and Robert Peel and William Ewart Gladstone each served as MP for Oxford University for portions of their careers. In his last years Ramsay MacDonald was MP for Combined Scottish Universities after losing his previous seat in the 1935 general election. Many criticised this, as he had previously sought to abolish the seats whilst Labour prime minister and many now felt the seats were being used to provide a failed politician with a seat he could not find elsewhere.

The humorist and law reform activist A. P. Herbert sat as an independent member for Oxford University from 1935 to 1950. He described the counting of the votes at the 1935 election in a chapter entitled P.R.': Or, Standing for Oxford in his 1936 book Mild and Bitter''.

India
India had university constituencies before independence, but these were abolished with the adoption of the modern Constitution of India. Nevertheless, today the President of India has the authority to appoint not more than twelve scientists, artists, or other persons who have special knowledge in similar fields, to the Rajya Sabha, the upper house in the Parliament of India. Currently, the upper houses of the state legislatures in the six states that have them have graduates' constituencies, that elect one-twelfth of their members. Each graduates' constituency is defined geographically rather than by university; graduates of any approved Indian university may choose to register in the graduates' constituency of their place of residence instead of registering in the ordinary constituency.

Ireland
 There are two university constituencies in Seanad Éireann, with graduates of the Dublin University and National University of Ireland entitled to elect three Senators each. Only graduates who are Irish citizens are entitled to vote in these elections. There is no residency requirement so those qualifying who are resident outside the State may vote. Elections are conducted under the single transferable vote and by postal ballot.

The Parliament of Ireland that existed until 1801 included the university constituency of Dublin University. This was continued in the House of Commons of the United Kingdom, and in 1918, the National University of Ireland was also given representation there.

When the Irish Free State seceded from the UK in 1922, its new lower house of parliament, the Free State Dáil, had three seats each for the two university constituencies. However, under the Electoral Act 1923 voters registered in a university constituency were not permitted to also vote in a geographical one. Both university constituencies were ultimately abolished by the Constitution (Amendment No. 23) Act 1936 and the Electoral (University Constituencies) Act 1936, which took effect on the dissolution of the Dáil in 1937. These two constituencies were recreated in Seanad Éireann under the Constitution of Ireland adopted in 1937, with the first Seanad election in 1938.

In 1979, the Seventh Amendment of the Constitution of Ireland permitted a redistribution of the six university seats between graduates of these named universities and any other institutes of higher education in the state. This was in anticipation of a possible dissolution of the National University of Ireland, but this did not in fact occur, and no change was made to the electorate of these constituencies.

Some politicians have called for university representation to be abolished, on the ground that it is unacceptable that possession of a degree should confer greater electoral rights than those available to other voters. An example of this view can be found in the Green Party submission on Seanad reform in 2004. The Socialist Party also stand for the abolition of these constituencies.

Other countriesAustralia: the electoral district of University of Sydney returned one member of the New South Wales Legislative Assembly between 1876 and 1880. It was abolished one year after the second member elected, Edmund Barton, took his seat.  Graduates of the University of Sydney wore academic gowns while voting.Rwanda: Two members of the Senate of Rwanda are elected by the staff of universities.Thirteen Colonies''': The College of William & Mary held a seat in the House of Burgesses of the Virginia Colony in 1693, and was supported by taxes on tobacco and furs. This seat was revoked after the House of Burgesses became the House of Delegates of the Commonwealth of Virginia within the newly independent United States of America.

See also
:Category: Members of the Parliament of the United Kingdom for university constituencies

References 

Ancient universities of Scotland
Elections in the United Kingdom
Elections in Australia
Elections in Ireland
Elections in the Republic of Ireland
Elections in India
Academia

Constituencies